Svetlana Nikolić Pavlović (born 1955) is a medical doctor and politician in Serbia. She has served in the National Assembly of Serbia since 2016 as a member of the Serbian Progressive Party.

Private career
Nikolić Pavlović is a cardiologist based in Ćuprija. She has an administrative position at the municipality's general hospital.

Political career
Nikolić Pavlović received the 177th position on the Progressive Party's Aleksandar Vučić — Future We Believe In electoral list in the 2014 Serbian parliamentary election. The list won a landslide victory with 158 out of 250 mandates; Nikolić Pavlović was not elected and was unable to enter the assembly as a replacement member before new elections were called.

She was promoted to the seventy-eighth position the successor Aleksandar Vučić – Serbia Is Winning list in the 2016 election and was elected when the list won a second consecutive majority with 131 seats. She is a member of the assembly's health and family committee; a deputy member of the environmental protection committee and the committee on labour, social issues, social inclusion, and poverty reduction; and a member of the parliamentary friendship groups with Azerbaijan, Denmark, Finland, Norway, Russia, Slovenia, Sweden, and Switzerland.

References

1955 births
Living people
People from Ćuprija
Members of the National Assembly (Serbia)
Serbian Progressive Party politicians